Bangkit LRT station is an elevated Light Rail Transit (LRT) station on the Bukit Panjang LRT line in Bukit Panjang, Singapore, located near the junction of Bukit Panjang Ring Road and Bangkit Road. It is near Greenridge Secondary School.

Etymology

The station is located near Bangkit Road. Bangkit means "rise" in Malay.

References

External links

Railway stations in Singapore opened in 1999
Bukit Panjang
Light Rail Transit (Singapore) stations
LRT stations of Bukit Panjang LRT Line